Mineral Nutrition of Plants: Principles and Perspectives (1972) is a book about plant nutrition by Emanuel Epstein.

Reception
F. C. Steward, C. Bould, and Manuel Lerdau have reviewed the book.

References

1972 non-fiction books
Plant nutrition
Botany books
Biology textbooks